Digitron is a Croatian electronics company located in Buje, Istria. Their name became eponymous for a handheld calculator in the former Yugoslav area. They are responsible for the release of Europe's first pocket calculator in 1971, called DB 800.

References

Further reading
 http://istrapedia.hr/hrv/580/digitron/istra-a-z/

External links

Istria County
Electronics companies established in 1971
Croatian brands
Electronics companies of Croatia